Johanna Strotzer (born 13 June 1951) is a German former volleyball player. She competed in the women's tournament at the 1976 Summer Olympics.

References

External links
 

1951 births
Living people
German women's volleyball players
Olympic volleyball players of East Germany
Volleyball players at the 1976 Summer Olympics
People from Böhlen
Sportspeople from Saxony